Too Much Information (or TMI) is a Canadian comedy panel show. The series aired on Super Channel for two seasons in 2014–2015. The series was produced by Lone Eagle Entertainment and hosted by Norm Sousa, with regular panelists including Canadian comedians such as Ron Sparks, Lauren Ash, Andrew Johnston, Carla Collins and Stewart Francis.

Awards
The show was nominated for Best TV Series at the 2015 Canadian Comedy Awards.

References

2014 Canadian television series debuts
2000s Canadian comedy television series
Super Channel (Canadian TV channel) original programming
2015 Canadian television series endings